Nanjimen Yangtze River Bridge is a rapid transit cable-stayed bridge that crosses the Yangtze to connect Yuzhong and Nan'an Districts in Chongqing. The bridge carries Chongqing Rail Transit Line 10 trains. It opened on 18 January 2023.

With a main span of  it is the longest metro-only cable-stayed bridge by main span in the world.

References

Cable-stayed bridges in China
Bridges in Chongqing
Railway bridges in China
Bridges completed in 2023